Other is the ninth studio album by English singer-songwriter Alison Moyet, released on 16 June 2017, by Cooking Vinyl.

It is her first album of new material since 2013's The Minutes, which saw her returning to her electronic music roots.

Background

In July 2013, Moyet revealed that she had begun writing new material for the follow-up to her eighth studio album, The Minutes. Studio sessions commenced in October 2016. She previewed a new song, "Other", from the then yet-to-be-titled-album, live at The Lexington for Cooking Vinyl's 30th Anniversary event on 5 December 2016.

On 17 March 2017, Moyet and her team revealed the title of the album as Other, along with describing it as an 'intelligent, adventurous electronic pop,' co-produced by Guy Sigsworth. The album became available to purchase for pre-release, along with the album's title track. A music video for "Other" was uploaded to Moyet's YouTube account.

Singles
Moyet announced and debuted a radio edit of the album's first official single, "Reassuring Pinches" on 29 April 2017, on Graham Norton's BBC Radio 2 show.

A music video for "The Rarest Birds", directed by Steve Gullick, premiered on 20 July 2017. The video was filmed in Brighton and features her daughter Caitlin Ballard. On the song, Moyet states, "The Rarest Birds is a paean to LGBTQ, to Brighton, to coming out after the darkest nights into the arms of those that delight in your flight. From me to you." Moyet performed the song live on The Graham Norton Show. The track was first previewed on Norton's radio show, 3 June 2017.

Promotion

The Other Tour
From September through December 2017, Moyet embarked on her first world tour in 30 years in support of the album, The Other Tour.

Track listing

Personnel
Credits for Other adapted from liner notes.
 Alison Moyet – lyrics and vocals
 Guy Sigsworth – strings, synthesisers, piano, harpsichord, guitar, bass, sound design
 Chris Elms – programming (tracks 1–4, 6–10), additional guitar (track 9), mixing (tracks 1–4, 6–10), engineering (tracks 1–4, 6–10)
 Jake Miller – programming (tracks 1–4, 5–10), additional guitar/slide guitar (track 5), additional guitar (track 9), mixing (tracks 5, 8), engineering (tracks 1–4, 5–10)
 Caitlin Ballard – additional background vocals (track 3)
 Tim Debney – mastering at Fluid Mastering
 Steve Coats-Dennis – digital manager
 Steve Gullick – photography
 Richard Griffiths – management
 Harry Magee – management
 Georgie Gibbon – management

Charts

Release history

References

External links
Alison's Moyet's blog – The Other Tour

External links
Alison Moyet's official website 

2017 albums
Albums produced by Guy Sigsworth
Alison Moyet albums
Cooking Vinyl albums